Dangjin–Yeongdeok Expressway also known as 6th East–West Expressway is an expressway in South Korea connecting Dangjin to Yeongdeok County.

Numbered 30, it means an East–West expressway. At 305.5 km, it is the fifth-longest expressway in South Korea. Two sections of the route, Dangjin-Daejeon Expressway and Cheongju-Yeongdeok Expressway is directly connected with Gyeongbu Expressway.

History 
 28 November 2007: Cheongwon JC-Nakdong JC segment opens to traffic
 27 August 2009 : Magoksa IC opened
 18 December 2009 : Nakdong JC-Yeongdeok IC begins construction
 23 December 2009 : N.Yuseong IC opened
 28 June 2012 : Nakdong JC-Sangju JC begins construction
 1 July 2012 : E.Gongju IC and N.Yuseong IC changed the name to E.Sejong  IC and S.Sejong IC 
 1 December 2014 : Cheongwon JC changed to Cheongju JC, Cheongwon-Sangju Expressway changed to Cheongju-Sangju Expressway
 23 December 2016 : Nakdong JC - Yeongdeok IC section was scheduled to open, but it was delayed to 00:00 on 26 December due to additional security problems. The postponement was announced during the opening ceremony on the 23rd
 26 December 2016 : Nakdong JC - Yeongdeok IC segment opened to traffic

Compositions 
 Lanes
 Dangjin JC ~ Hoedeok JC, Cheongju JC ~ Yeongdeok IC : 4 lanes
 Hoedeok JC ~ Cheongju JC (Gyeongbu Expressway overlap) : 8 lanes

 Length
 197.88 km 

 Speed limit
 Dangjin JC ~ Yuseong JC, Cheongju JC ~ Nakdong JC  : 110 km/h
 Yuseong JC ~ Cheongju JC, Nakdong JC ~ Yeongdeok IC : 100 km/h

Tunnels 
 Dangjin ~ Daejeon section

 Cheongju ~ Sangju section

 Nakdong Tunnel
 Danmil 1 Tunnel
 Danmil 2 Tunnel
 Danmil 3 Tunnel
 Danmil 4 Tunnel
 Ansa 1 Tunnel
 Ansa 2 Tunnel
 Anpyeong 1 Tunnel
 Anpyeong 2 Tunnel
 Anpyeong 3 Tunnel
 Danchon 1 Tunnel
 Danchon 2 Tunnel
 Danchon 3 Tunnel
 Danchon 4 Tunnel
 Oksan Tunnel
 Gilan 1 Tunnel
 Gilan 2 Tunnel
 Gilan 3 Tunnel
 Gilan 4 Tunnel
 Sailsan Tunnel
 Pacheon 1 Tunnel
 Pacheon 2 Tunnel
 Pacheon 3 Tunnel
 Jinbo Tunnel
 Jipum 1 Tunnel
Jipum 2 Tunnel
 Jipum 3 Tunnel
 Jipum 4 Tunnel
 Jipum 5 Tunnel
 Jipum 6 Tunnel
 Jipum 7 Tunnel
 Jipum 8 Tunnel
 Jipum 9 Tunnel
 Jipum 10 Tunnel
 Dalsan 1 Tunnel
 Dalsan 2 Tunnel
 Dalsan 3 Tunnel
 Yeongdeok Tunnel

Bridges 

 Dangjin-Cheongju section
 Sagiso Bridge
 Samung Bridge
 Seongha 2 Bridge
 Wondong 1 Bridge
 Wondong 2 Bridge
 Monggok Bridge
 Jagae 2 Bridge
 Godeok 2 Bridge
 Godeok 3 Bridge
 Daecheoncheon Bridge
 Seokgok 1 Bridge
 Yongri 1 Bridge
 Yongri 2 Bridge
 Sapgyocheon Bridge
 Hapo Bridge
 Buncheon 1 Bridge
 Buncheon 2 Bridge
 Buncheon 3 Bridge
 Jwabang 1 Bridge
 Jwabang 2 Bridge
 Sinseokyuk Bridge
 Wolgok Bridge
 Sinjang 1 Bridge
 Sinjang 2 Bridge
 Sinjang 3 Bridge
 Yesan Bridge
 Sonji  Bridge
 Tanbang Bridge
 Seogyeyang Bridge
 Nokmun Bridge
 Sinyang 1 Bridge
 Sinyang 2 Bridge
 Daedeok Bridge
 Chadong 1 Bridge
 Chadong 2 Bridge
 Nokcheon 1 Bridge
 Nokcheon 2 Bridge
 Seungji Bridge
 Yugu 1 Bridge
 Yugu 2 Bridge
 Hwaheung 1 Bridge
 Hwaheung 2 Bridge
 Hwaheung 3 Bridge
 Haewol Bridge
 Haewol 1 Bridge
 Hogye Bridge
 Saedeul Bridge
 Hongcheon Bridge
 Dongdae Bridge
 Bangmun Bridge
 Sangseo Bridge
 Docheon 1 Bridge
 Docheon 2 Bridge
 Sinung Bridge
 Gwisan Bridge
 Jeongancheon Bridge
 Cheongryong 1 Bridge
 Cheongryong 2 Bridge
 Habong 2 Bridge
 Eunyong Bridge
 Sanak 3 Bridge
 Daegyocheon Bridge
 Songwon Bridge
 Geumgang Bridge (488m long)
 Yongsucheon Bridge
 Ansan 1 Bridge
 Ansan 2 Bridge
 Yuseong Bridge
 Hagi 1 Bridge
 Hagi 2 Bridge
 Hagi 3 Bridge
 Tandong Bridge
 Jangdong Bridge
 Seolmok Overpass
 Hwaam Bridge
 Gapcheon Bridge
 Sangseo 1 Bridge
 Seokbong Overpass
 Geumgang 1 Bridge
 Maebongcheol Overpass
 Maebong 1 Overpass
 Seondong Bridge
 Sidong Bridge
 Jukjeon Bridge
 Jukam Bridge
 Nami Bridge
 Nami Overpass

 Cheongju-Yeongdeok section
 Cheoksan 2 Bridge
 Cheoksan 3 Bridge 
 Cheogksan 4 Bridge
 Namgye 1 Bridge
 Namgye 2 Bridge
 Namgye 3 Bridge
 Gukjeon Bridge 
 Samhang 1 Bridge
 Munui Bridge
 Nohyeon Bridge
 Yongchon Bridge
 Hoein Bridge
 Busu 1 Bridge 
 Busu 2 Bridge
 Hoein Bridge (925m long)
 Geoncheon Bridge
 Suriti Bridge 
 Chajeong Bridge 
 Dongjeong Bridge
 Bocheong Bridge
 Gyoam 1 Bridge
 Gyoam 2 Bridge
 Seongri Bridge
 Sogye Bridge 
 Geumgul Bridge
 Bocheongcheon Bridge
 Sangjang 1 Bridge
 Sangjang 2 Bridge
 Samgacheon Bridge
 Bongbi Bridge
 Bulmok 1 Bridge
 Sumun Bridge
 Galpyeong Bridge
 Gubyeongsan Bridge
 Pyeongon Bridge
 Sangreung Bridge
 Geumsan Bridge
 Dalcheon 1 Bridge
 Dalcheon 2 Bridge
 Dalcheon 3 Bridge
 Jisan 1 Bridge
 Jisan 2 Bridge
 Hwaseo Bridge
 Samgok Bridge
 Seowon 1 Bridge
 Seowon 2 Bridge
 Seowon 3 Bridge
 Seowon 4 Bridge 
 Gogok 1 Bridge
 Gogok 2 Bridge
 Naeseo 1 Bridge
 Naeseo 2 Bridge
 Neungam Bridge
 Jisa Bridge
 Gajang Bridge
 Byeongseongcheon 1 Bridge
 Byeongseongcheon 2 Bridge
 Jicheon 2 Bridge
 Jicheon 3 Bridge
 Jicheon 4 Bridge
 Unpyeong 1 Bridge
 Unpyeong 2 Bridge
 Seoje Bridge 
 Dodeok 1 Bridge
 Dodeok 2 Bridge
 Samchun 1 Bridge
 Jangrimcheon Bridge
 Gilancheon Bridge
 Mukgye 1 Bridge 
 Yonggyecheon Bridge
 Yongjeoncheon Bridge
 Seosicheon Bridge
 Jipum 2 Bridge
 Osipcheon 1 Bridge
 Osipcheon 2 Bridge
 Yongdeokcheon Bridge
 Soseocheon Bridge
 Daeseocheon Bridge

Major stopovers 
 South Chungcheong Province 
 Dangjin (Sagiso-dong - Myeoncheon-myeon) - Yesan County (Bongsan-myeon - Godeok-myeon - Sapgyo-eup - Oga-myeon - Eungbong-myeon - Daeheung-myeon - Sanyang-myeon) - Gongju (Yugu-eup - Sinpung-myeon - Sagok-myeon - Useong-myeon - Wolmi-dong - Useong-myeon - Uidang-myeon)

 Sejong
 Janggun-myeon - Yeongi-myeon

 South Chungcheong Province
 Gongju Banpo-myeon

 Sejong
 Geumnam-myeon

 Daejeon
 Yuseong District (Ansan-dong - Oesam-dong - Banseok-dong - Oesam-dong - Hagi-dong - Jaun-dong - Jang-dong - Banghyeon-dong - Hwaam-dong - Gwanpyeong-dong - Yongsan-dong - Tamnip-dong - Jeonmin-dong) - Daedeok District (Sindae-dong - Wa-dong - Sangseo-dong - Deokam-dong - Moksang-dong - Seokbong-dong)

 North Chungcheong Province 
 Cheongju Seowon District (Hhyeondo-myeon - Nami-myeon) - Cheongju Sangdang District (Munui-myeon - Gadeok-myeon) - Boeun County (Hoein-myeon - Suhan-myeon - Boeun-eup - Tanbu-myeon - Jangan-myeon - Maro-myeon)

 North Gyeongsang Province
 Sangju (Hwanam-myeon - Hwaseo-myeon - Naeseo-myeon - [[Oenam-myeon - Gaeun-dong - Gajang-dong - Yangchon-dong - Jicheon-dong - Odae-dong - Geodong-dong - Nakdong-myeon) - Uiseong County (Danmil-myeon - Danbuk-myeon - Angye-myeon - Ansa-myeon - Anpyeong-myeon) - Andong Iljik-myeon - Uiseong County (Danchon-myeon - Jeomgok-myeon - Oksan-myeon) - Andong]] Gilan-myeon - Cheongsong County (Pacheon-myeon - Jinbo-myeon) - Yeongdeok County (Jipum-myeon - Dalsan-myeon - Ganggu-myeon - Yeongdeok-eup)

List of facilities

IC: Interchange, JC: Junction, SA: Service Area, TG:Tollgate
 Light purple(■): Honam Expressway overlap
 Light green(■): Gyeongbu Expressway overlap
 Light blue(■): Sangju-Yeongcheon Expressway overlap

See also 
Roads and expressways in South Korea
Transportation in South Korea

References

External links 
 한국도로공사
 당진영덕고속도로 영상보기
 MOLIT South Korean Government Transport Department

 
Expressways in South Korea
Transport in South Chungcheong Province
Transport in Sejong
Transport in Daejeon
Transport in North Chungcheong Province
Transport in North Gyeongsang Province
Roads in South Chungcheong
Roads in Sejong
Roads in Daejeon
Roads in North Chungcheong
Roads in North Gyeongsang